William Joseph DeBoe (June 30, 1849June 15, 1927) was a U.S. Senator representing Kentucky from 1897 to 1903.

Early life

Born in Crittenden County, Kentucky, DeBoe attended Ewing College in Illinois, studying both law and medicine. He graduated from the University of Louisville School of Medicine and practiced for a few years. The then renewed the study of law and was admitted to the bar in 1889. He practiced law in Marion, Kentucky (Crittenden County).

Career
DeBoe served as superintendent of schools of Crittenden County. He then ran an unsuccessful candidacy for election in 1892 to Congress. He served as a member of the Kentucky State Senate from 1893 to 1898. He was afterward elected as a Republican to the United States Senate and served from March 4, 1897, to March 3, 1903. He was not a candidate for renomination in 1902.

While in the Senate, DeBoe served as chairman to the Committee on Indian Depredations and the Committee to Establish the University of the United States. He was a delegate from Kentucky to the 1912 Republican National Convention. Ten years later he served as the postmaster of Marion, Kentucky from 1923 to 1927. He died in Marion and was interred in Maple View Cemetery.

Sources 

 Political Graveyard

1849 births
1927 deaths
People from Crittenden County, Kentucky
Republican Party United States senators from Kentucky
Kentucky state senators
Physicians from Kentucky
Kentucky lawyers
19th-century American lawyers
University of Louisville School of Medicine alumni